Thomas John Dempsey (January 12, 1947April 4, 2020) was an American professional football player who was a placekicker in the National Football League (NFL) for the New Orleans Saints, Philadelphia Eagles, Los Angeles Rams, Houston Oilers and Buffalo Bills. Unlike the "soccer style" approach which was becoming more and more widely used during his career, Dempsey's kicking style was the then-standard straight-toe style. With the Saints in 1970, he made a 63-yard field goal, setting an NFL record which stood for over 40 years.

Early life
Dempsey was born in Milwaukee and attended high school and college in Southern California. He attended high school at San Dieguito High School and played college football at Palomar College. He was born with no toes on his right foot and no fingers on his right hand. Dempsey wore a custom, flat-front kicking shoe that had no toe box.

NFL career
Dempsey is most widely known for kicking a 63-yard field goal as time expired to give the Saints a 19–17 win over the Detroit Lions on November 8, 1970, at Tulane Stadium in New Orleans. Prior to 1974, the goal posts in the NFL were on the goal lines instead of the end lines. With time running out in the game, the Saints attempted a field goal with holder Joe Scarpati spotting at the Saints' own 37-yard line. The snap from Jackie Burkett was good, and Dempsey made the field goal as the ball fell just beyond the bar. The win was one of only two for the Saints in that dismal season.

With the kick, Dempsey broke Bert Rechichar's NFL record for longest field goal by seven yards. His record was tied three times—by Jason Elam in 1998, Sebastian Janikowski in 2011 and David Akers in 2012—before it was broken on December 8, 2013,
by Matt Prater, who hit a 64-yard field goal.  On Sunday, September 26, 2021, Justin Tucker of the Baltimore Ravens broke that record with a 66-yard field goal as time expired to beat the Detroit Lions. This walk-off kick eclipsed both Dempsey's and Graham Gano's 63-yarder in 2018 as the longest field goal to win a game on its final play.

Dempsey was born without toes on his right foot and no fingers on his right hand. He wore a modified shoe with a flattened and enlarged toe surface. The custom made, $200 shoe generated controversy about whether such a shoe gave a player an unfair advantage. When reporters would ask him if he thought it was unfair, he said, "Unfair, eh? How 'bout you try kickin' a 63 yard field goal to win it with 2 seconds left an' yer wearin' a square shoe, oh yeah, and no toes either." Additionally, when an analysis of his kick was carried out by ESPN Sport Science, it was found that his modified shoe had offered him no advantage. In fact, it was found that the smaller contact area could have increased, not reduced, the margin for error.

The league made two rule changes in the subsequent years to discourage further long field goal attempts. The first was in 1974, which moved the goal posts from the goal line to the back of the end zone, adding ten yards to the kick distance, and awarded the ball to the defense on a missed kick at the spot where the ball was snapped. This was changed in 1994 to the spot of the kick. Then, in 1977, the NFL added a rule, informally known as the "Tom Dempsey Rule", that "any shoe that is worn by a player with an artificial limb on his kicking leg must have a kicking surface that conforms to that of a normal kicking shoe."

Since Dempsey was the only kicker to make a field goal from more than sixty yards prior to the relocation of the goal posts, he remains the only player in NFL history to successfully kick a field goal from beyond his own team's 40-yard line.

Career regular season statistics
Career high/best bolded

Source:

Post career
In 1983, Dempsey was inducted into the American Football Association's Semi-Pro Football Hall of Fame.

After retiring from football he resided with his wife Carlene, who taught history at Kehoe-France, a private school in Metairie, Louisiana, a suburb of New Orleans.  His house was flooded during Hurricane Katrina in 2005.

Personal life and death
Dempsey married Carlene and had three children, one named Ashley.

In January 2013, Dempsey revealed he had dementia. Psychiatrist Daniel Amen made the initial diagnosis of damage to Dempsey's brain. During medical examinations and scans, Amen found three holes in the brain, along with other damage.

On March 30, 2020, Dempsey tested positive for COVID-19 during the pandemic. He was one of 15 residents at a New Orleans senior residence to test positive for the virus. Dempsey died on April 4, of complications from COVID-19.

References

External links

1947 births
2020 deaths
People from Metairie, Louisiana
American disabled sportspeople
Players of American football from Milwaukee
American football placekickers
Palomar Comets football players
New Orleans Saints players
Philadelphia Eagles players
Los Angeles Rams players
Houston Oilers players
Buffalo Bills players
Eastern Conference Pro Bowl players
Deaths from the COVID-19 pandemic in Louisiana